In mycology, acanthocyte refers to stellate cells found on the hyphae of fungi of the genus Stropharia. Recent work, published in 2006, on those of Stropharia rugosoannulata has shown them to have nematode-killing properties.

References

Mycology